Sergey Parkhomenko may refer to:
 Sergey Parkhomenko (born 1964), Russian publisher and journalist
 Sergey Parkhomenko (born 1976), Belarusian rapper known as Seryoga